John Kelland (c. 1635 – 7 October 1692), of Painsford in the parish of Ashprington in  Devon, was a Member of Parliament for Totnes in March 1679, 1681 and 1685.

References

1635 births
1692 deaths
English MPs 1679
Members of the Parliament of England (pre-1707) for Totnes
English MPs 1681
English MPs 1685–1687